Philip Repyngdon ( – 1424) was a bishop and cardinal.

Life
It is believed Repyngdon was born in Wales in around 1345. He became an Augustinian canon, first at Repton Abbey, then at Leicester Abbey where he was ordained to the priesthood on 26 May 1369. He was educated at Broadgates Hall, Oxford, graduating with a Doctorate of Divinity in 1382.

A man of some learning, Repyngdon came to the front as a defender of the doctrines taught by John Wycliffe; for this he was suspended and afterwards excommunicated, but in a short time he was pardoned and restored by Archbishop William Courtenay, and he appears to have completely abandoned his unorthodox opinions.

In 1394, Repyngdon was made abbot of the abbey of Saint Mary de Pratis at Leicester, and after the accession of Henry IV to the English throne in 1399 he became chaplain and confessor to this king, being described as clericus specialissimus domini regis Henrici.

On 19 November 1404, Repyngdon was chosen bishop of Lincoln, and was consecrated on 29 March 1405. In 1408, Pope Gregory XII created him a cardinal, however, it was not recognised in England, and the creation was revoked in 1409. He resigned his bishopric on 20 November 1419. Some of Repyngdon's sermons are in manuscript at Oxford and at Cambridge.

In 1405, Repyngdon attempted to promote a pilgrimage site at Yarborough devoted to the Blessed Sacrament, after the church there was destroyed by fire. The pyx which contained the consecrated Host was the only thing to survive the fire, and the bishop attempted to establish a cult centre there, but it failed.

Notes

References

Bibliography

 
 
 

1340s births
1424 deaths
14th-century Welsh Roman Catholic priests
15th-century English Roman Catholic bishops
Alumni of Broadgates Hall, Oxford
Augustinian canons
Bishops of Lincoln
Chancellors of the University of Oxford
Welsh cardinals
People temporarily excommunicated by the Catholic Church
Year of birth uncertain